In photography, solarization is the effect of tone reversal observed in cases of extreme overexposure of the photographic film in the camera. Most likely, the effect was first observed in scenery photographs including the sun. The sun, instead of being the whitest spot in the image, turned black or grey. For instance, Minor White's photograph of a winter scene, The Black Sun 1955, was a result of the shutter of his camera freezing in the open position, producing severe overexposure. Ansel Adams had also earlier created a solarized sun image, titled Black Sun, Owens Valley, California, 1939, by overexposure.

Definition
When a photographic layer, suitable for solarization (see below), is exposed to actinic radiation, the resulting darkening after development will not increase steadily, but reaches a maximum which decreases under more intense exposure. In general is the phenomenon only then called solarization if the exposure has been produced in one "shot", meaning no pauses or double-exposures. The exposure to achieve solarization can be increased by exposure time or by increasing the light intensity

History
The solarization effect was already known to Daguerre and is one of the earliest known effects in photography. John William Draper was the first to call the overexposure effect solarisation. J.W.F. Herschel already observed the reversal of the image from negative to positive by extreme overexposure in 1840. Also N.M.P. Lerebours observed the phenomenon in 1842 (without him recognizing what it was) when he made a daguerreotype of an image of the sun. The result was seen as unsatisfactory because the solar disk (image of the sun on the daguerreotype plate) was overexposed and solarized. L. Moser reported in 1843: "...that the light in the camera obscura produces at first the well known negative image; with continued action of the light the image turns into a positive image.... and recently I have obtained in fact on occasion a third image which is negative". In 1880 Janssen had obtained in the strongest sunlight a repetition of the solarization phenomena.

Explanation
Not every photographic layer exhibits solarization. Pure Chloride and Iodine based silver emulsions are difficult or unable to solarize. In general, it can be stated that solarisation can only be observed if the photographic layer is capable to create  a latent image inside the halide grain underexposure by actinic radiation.
Many explanations have been given but until further notice, the solarization was until 1929 generally understood as a combination of two main processes: the coagulation (clotting) and the regression process.

Regression theory 
The regression process theory was formulated by H. Luppo-Cramer in 1911, based on research by F. Hurter, V.C. Driffield and H. Luggin.

By exposure the surface and the interior of a silver-bromide sphere will disintegrate by the expulsion of bromide. Whereas the bromide on the surface can permeate away, the bromide can not so easily permeate away from the interior. The overexposure generates now a bromide pressure that escapes from the internal sphere and permeates to the surface where it oxidizes the latent image situated there, constituting the regular latent image under normal exposures. This destroys the latent image, because only silver on the surface can be developed.

Coagulation theory 
H. Arens published in 1925 a paper about reversal effects in which he concluded that solarization is based upon the finding that under increasing exposure the latent image successively coagulates and thus increases the size of each particular silverspeck. This again causes the silverspeck to lose its catalytic effect for the development.

Bromide migration theory 
H. Kieser published in 1929 a paper in which he speculated about the possibility of bromide migration by defect electrons (more: Photosensitivity).

In recent years an understanding has been agreed upon in which this bromide migration to the surface by overexposure forms a bromine condensation, resulting in bromine molecules or bromine atoms diffusing to the silverspecks of the latent image. Thus the latent image at the crystal surface can be re-halogenated by chemical reaction, notwithstanding an increase of the amount of latent image in the interior of the crystal. Still, the regression and coagulation theories are believed to contribute up to a certain level to the solarization effect.

Pseudo-solarization

Pseudo-solarisation (or pseudo-solarization) is a phenomenon in photography in which the image recorded on a negative or on a photographic print is wholly or partially reversed in tone. Dark areas appear light or light areas appear dark. The term is synonymous with the Sabattier-effect when referring to negatives. Solarisation and pseudo-solarisation are quite distinct effects.

In short, the mechanism is due to halogen ions released within the halide grain by exposure diffusing to the grain surface in amounts sufficient to destroy the latent image.

References

Photographic techniques
Science of photography